The Men's Freestyle 74 kg competition of the Wrestling events at the 2015 Pan American Games in Toronto were held on July 18 at the Mississauga Sports Centre.

Schedule
All times are Eastern Daylight Time (UTC-4).

Results
Legend
F — Won by fall

Final

Repechage

References

Wrestling at the 2015 Pan American Games